Vishaul Anthony Singh (born 12 January 1989) is a Guyanese cricketer who plays for the West Indies. His domestic side is Guyanese national side. He is a left-handed middle-order batsman.

Domestic career
Singh made his first-class debut for Guyana during the 2008–09 Regional Four Day Competition, against Barbados. He made his first half-century for the team during the 2010–11 season, scoring 66 from 164 balls in a home match against Barbados. Singh's maiden first-class century came during the 2014–15 season, when he scored 141 from 229 balls against Trinidad and Tobago to help his team win by an innings. He continued his good form during the 2015–16 season, making centuries in consecutive matches against the Leeward Islands (150 from 385 balls) and Barbados (121 from 241 balls).

International career
In April 2017, he was named in the West Indies Test squad for their series against Pakistan. He made his Test debut for the West Indies against Pakistan on 21 April 2017 at Sabina Park.He scored 9 Runs in his first innings and was caught out by Wahab Riaz. His poor run continued and was subsequently not selected for the West Indies tour of England 2017.

References

External links

1989 births
Living people
West Indies Test cricketers
Guyana cricketers
Guyanese cricketers
Sportspeople from Georgetown, Guyana
Indo-Guyanese people
Sportspeople of Indian descent